Guilbert Bled (20 June 1895 – 31 October 1940) was a French racing cyclist. He rode in the 1927 Tour de France.

References

1895 births
1940 deaths
French male cyclists
Place of birth missing